Cine Blitz is a Hindi and English film magazine published every month from Mumbai about Bollywood, Hindi cinema. Started in December 1974, as of 2006, it was one of the top three film magazines in India.

Cine Blitz belongs to E.N. Communication Pvt Ltd. It was originally started by Rifa Publications, headed by Russi Karanjia and publishers of the popular political weekly Blitz. His daughter Rita Mehta was the first editor-in-chief of the magazine.

History
Cine Blitz was launched by Russy Karanjia's Rifa Publications in December 1974,and his daughter Rita Mehta became the first editor-in-chief of the magazine. The first issue of December 1974, had Zeenat Aman on the cover. To give the new magazine "a flying start," Rita Mehta approached Protima Bedi and asked her to streak across Mumbai, first at Flora Fountain and then at Juhu Beach. Pictures of it would be carried in the inside pages of the inaugural edition.

The ensuing controversy forced the magazine to then (falsely) claim that the naked run was actually shot in Goa and later superimposed on images of Mumbai. However, the goal of popularising the new magazine was achieved and Cine Blitz went on to become one of India's leading film and gossip magazines for years to come. Its attitude was reflected in its rather tongue-in-cheek tagline of "C to Z of Hindi Films - Everyone covers AB".

For the subsequent three decades  Cine Blitz continued to be a leading film magazine. However around 2000, the magazine sales stagnated for three years and in 2001 it was acquired by UB Group chairman Vijay Mallya under groups by VJM Media Private Limited, though Rita Mehta, its previous owner continued as editor-in-chief of the magazine.

The acquisition lead to the revamp of the magazine, and in 2003 Cine Blitz launched its international editions,  US and UK editions  catering to the Asian diaspora, with launch function in London. And in 2006, Rita Mehta was replaced as editor-in-chief by Nishi Prem, the former editor of Stardust.

In 2009, to mark its 35th anniversary, the magazine released a coffee table book about history of Hindi film industry, Love & Longing in Hindi Cinema by editor Nishi Prem.

Since May 2020, Cineblitz launched an exclusive digital only edition and in June 2020 Cineblitz announced its Annual Awards.

References

Bibliography

External links
 Official website

1974 establishments in Maharashtra
Hindi cinema
English-language magazines published in India
Hindi-language magazines
Film magazines published in India
Monthly magazines published in India
Magazines established in 1974
Mass media in Mumbai
United Breweries Group